The Coade Hall is a brick-built theatre and concert hall at Bryanston School, near Blandford Forum in Dorset, England. It was opened on 27 May 1966 by the Duke of Edinburgh. On the opening night, there was a concert with music by Brahms, Britten, and Mozart.

The Coade Hall is named after Thorold Coade, headmaster of Bryanston School from 1932 to 1959.
It is used for professional performances  and also by the school for drama, assemblies, and other communal activities.
Performers such as Johnny Dankworth, Cleo Laine, George Melly, and Steamhammer have appeared there.

References 

Buildings and structures completed in 1966
1966 establishments in England
Theatres in Dorset
Concert halls in England